The Order of the Falcon of Štefánik, also known unofficially as the Štefánikův Order was a Czechoslovak order established in November 1918.

History
The establishment of the Order of the Falcon in 1919 resulted from a proposal in September 1918 by the Minister of War Milan Rastislav Štefánik (hence the unofficial name)
 and was intended to recognise achievements that contributed to the liberation of Czechoslovakia.  Membership of the order was primarily conferred upon members of the Czechoslovak Legions who served in Siberia during the Russian Civil War. The order was short-lived as all Czechoslovak orders were abolished in 1919, soon after the Czechoslovak Republic declared independence; they were 'regarded as undemocratic'.
One of the most famous officers to be appointed a Knight of the Order of the Falcon was Major General Jan Syrový. During the Russian Civil War, Syrový commanded all anti-Bolshevik forces in Siberia from October 1918 to January 1919  and, in September 1938 as the Czechoslovak Prime Minister, he was forced to accept the terms of the Munich Agreement.

Composition
Appointments to the Order were in either the Military or Civilian divisions. The order was intended to consist of five classes:
 Grand Cross, Class I
 Grand Officer, Class II
 Commander, Class III
 Officer, Class IV
 Knight, Class V
In practice appointments were only made to the lowest class.

Insignia
Badge. The badge of the order is an inverted star (point down) comprising a convex central white enamel disc, edged white with a gilt border, the whole surrounded by five  pattée moussé, edged white with gilt borders. The obverse of the center disc is charged with three hills in blue with gilt borders, surmounted by four gilt falcons in flight. The reverse of the convex center disc is charged with the monogram ČS in blue with gilt borders, surmounting the date 1918 in gilt and surrounded on either side by a branch of gilt laurel leaves.

Suspension device. The badge for civilian awards is suspended from a circlet formed from gilt laurel leaves, whilst gilt crossed swords are added to the suspension device for military awards.

Ribbon. The badge of the order is suspended from a red moire silk ribbon divided by a central narrow white stripe, with a thin white stripe set in from either edge.

Star. Appointments could also be made with a star affixed to the ribbon signifying additional distinction.

Štefánik had the first insignia produced in Tokyo; these were supplied in a lacquered balsa wood box.

Knights

The following is an incomplete list of people appointed as Knights of the Order of the Falcon:

Legend

Ranks
 ArmyGen = Army General, equivalent to General (4-star rank)
 LtGen = Lieutenant General (3-star rank)
 DivGen = Division General, equivalent to Major General (2-star rank)
 ChiefGenIS = Chief General of the Intendent Services, equivalent to Major General
 ChiefGenMS = Chief General of the Medical Services, equivalent to Major General
 BdeGen = Brigade General, equivalent to Brigadier General (1-star rank)
 (Bde)Gen = General, equivalent to Brigadier General
 GenLS = General of the Legal Services, equivalent to Brigadier General
 GenMS = General of the Medical Services, equivalent to Brigadier General
 GenTOSA = General of the Technical Ordnance Service of Aviation, equivalent to Brigadier General
 Mem = in memoriam, rank was granted posthumously
Service/Branch
 Arty = Artillery, Engr = Engineering, Inf = Infantry, Leg = Legal, Med = Medical, Offr = Officer, Ord = Ordnance
 CS = Czechoslovak, Fr = French, Ru = Russian

References 

 

Orders, decorations, and medals of Czechoslovakia
Awards established in 1918
1918 establishments in Czechoslovakia
1919 disestablishments in Czechoslovakia